The 2007 Dallas Cup was the 28th since its establishment, 12 teams entering in the tournament. The competition was sponsored by Dr Pepper. São Paulo beat Chelsea 1–0 in the Championship and won the 2007 Dallas Cup.

Standings

Bracket A

Bracket B

Bracket C

Semifinal

Third place

Championship

External links 
 2007 Dr Pepper Dallas Cup XXVIII

2007 in American soccer
Dallas Cup
Dallas Cup